Olympic Skeet is a variant of skeet shooting, and the specific variant used in the Olympic Games. The discipline is sanctioned by the International Shooting Sport Federation. Two throwing machines at different heights launch a series of 25 targets in a specific order, some as singles and some as doubles, with the shooter having a fixed position between them. Both men's and women's competitions consist of five such series.  The top six competitors shoot an additional series as a final round, on targets filled with special powder to show hits more clearly to the audience.
The competitors use shotguns of 12 bore or smaller. allowed are all actions, including double barrel breech loaders, semi-automatic or others, but not pump action guns.

History
Unlike English Skeet, participants shooting Olympic Skeet must call for the clays with their gun off the shoulder, with the stock positioned level with the hip. There is also a delay switch incorporated within the clay trap, meaning the clays might be released immediately, or up to three seconds after the clay is called by the shooter. Under no circumstances must the gun be moved until the clay is released, or the shooter will face disqualification.

The event was introduced in 1968, and until 1992 both men and women were allowed to participate.  But in 1996 the event was limited to men only, which was somewhat controversial because the 1992 Olympic Champion was a woman, Shan Zhang of China. In 2000, a female skeet event was introduced.

25 Shot Sequence
Station 1
Single from the High House 
Pair: High House target to be shot first 
Station 2
Single from the High House
Pair: High House target to be shot first 
Station 3
Single from the High House
Pair: High House target to be shot first 
Station 4 (Part 1)
Single from the High House
Single from the Low House  
Station 5
Single from the Low House
Pair: Low House target to be shot first 
Station 6
Single from the Low House
Pair: Low House target to be shot first 
Station 7
Pair: Low House target to be shot first 
Station 4 (Part 2)
Pair: High House target to be shot first
Pair: Low House target to be shot first
Station 8 
Single from the High House
Single from the Low House

Olympic Games

Mixed / Men's skeet

Women's skeet

World Championships, Men

World Championships, Men Team

World Championships, Women

World Championships, Women Team

World Championships, total medals

Current world records

See also
 International Shooting Sport Federation
 ISSF shooting events
 ISSF Olympic trap
 Double trap

References

External links

ISSF shooting events

Shotgun shooting sports
Rifle and pistol shooting sports
Lists of sport shooters